Despite common origins, the economy of the Socialist Federal Republic of Yugoslavia (SFRY) was significantly different from the economies of the Soviet Union and other Eastern European socialist states, especially after the Yugoslav-Soviet break-up in 1948. The occupation and liberation struggle in World War II left Yugoslavia's infrastructure devastated. Even the most developed parts of the country were largely rural, and the little industry of the country was largely damaged or destroyed.

Post-World War II years
The first postwar years saw implementation of Soviet-style five-year plans and reconstruction through massive voluntary work. The countryside was electrified, and heavy industry was developed. The economy was organized as a mixture of a planned socialist economy and a market socialist economy: factories were nationalized, and workers were entitled to a certain share of their profits. Privately owned craft shops could employ up to 4 people per owner. The land was partially nationalized and redistributed, and partially collectivized. These could sell and buy land, as well as give it to people in perpetual lease.

The exact nature and extent of market socialism in Yugoslavia is debated by economists. The market mechanism was limited mostly to consumer goods, while capital, labor, materials and intermediate goods were allocated by different means. The Yugoslav model didn't have much in common with the classic model of market socialism imagined by Oskar R. Lange. John Roemer, an advocate of market socialism, had a very negative view of the Yugoslav experiment, claiming that Yugoslav companies weren't run on true market principles of competition and profit, and that they instead relied on soft budget constraints and were subjected to political control, which created a deeply inefficient system that ultimately collapsed. While admitting that it is somewhat problematic to use the term market in the context of socialist countries such as Yugoslavia or Hungary (after the introduction of New Economic Mechanism), János Kornai believed that the term market socialism is still appropriate because such countries at least partially experimented with markets under socialism which would otherwise remain only an abstract idea.

Youth work actions

Youth work actions were organized voluntary labor activities of young people in the Socialist Federal Republic of Yugoslavia. The actions were used to build public infrastructure such as roads, railways, and public buildings, as well as industrial infrastructure. The youth work actions were organized on the local, republic, and federal levels by the Young Communist League of Yugoslavia, and participants were organized into youth work brigades, generally named after their town or a local national hero. Important projects built by youth work brigades include the Brčko–Banovići railway, the Šamac–Sarajevo railway, parts of New Belgrade, and parts of the Highway of Brotherhood and Unity, which stretches from northern Slovenia to southern Macedonia.

1950s and 1960s
In the 1950s, socialist self-management was introduced, which reduced the state management of enterprises. Managers of socially owned companies were supervised by workers' councils, which were all made up of employees, with one vote each. The workers' councils also appointed the management, often by secret ballot. The Communist Party (later on the League of Communists) was organized in all companies and most influential employees were likely to be members of the party, so the managers were often, but not always, appointed only with the consent of workers who happened to be members of the party. There were occasional tensions between market-oriented managers and worker representatives. However, the GDP is not technically applicable or designed to measure planned economies; in 1950, Yugoslavia's GDP ranked twenty-second in Europe.

Unemployment was a chronic problem for Yugoslavia. The unemployment rates were among the highest in Europe during its existence, while the education level of the work force increased steadily. The unemployment rate reached 7% in the early 1960s and continued to grow, doubling by the mid 1970s. There were extreme regional differences in unemployment, with the Slovenian rate never exceeding 5%, while Macedonia and Kosovo constantly had rates over 20%.  There was also a notable element of gender discrimination in the unemployment rate.  When forced to cut workforce, enterprises usually fired women first, expecting that women can be supported by their male family members.  Some enterprises also requested that candidates for a job needed to have their military service completed, which excluded women. Female participation rates were lower than in other socialist countries and closer to traditionalist societies of Southern Europe. 

Due to Yugoslavia's neutrality, and its leading role in the Non-Aligned Movement, Yugoslavia traded with both Western and Eastern markets.  Starting in the early 1950s, it also received billions of dollars of Western foreign aid, mostly from the United States.  The trade with Non-Aligned countries amounted to only 15% of total trade in 1965.  Despite several trade agreements, it never managed to become significant because of its geographic distance and the fact that both sides were exporters of commodities and simple products, interested mostly in imports of Western technological goods.  In 1964, when Yugoslavia was granted special associate status with Comecon, its trade with Eastern markets was less than 25% of total trade, and OECD was the main trading partner with around 60%.  Yugoslavia had a very poor foreign trade record with trade account deficits in almost every year of its existence. 

Yugoslav companies carried out construction of numerous major infrastructural and industrial projects in Africa, Europe and Asia. Many of these projects were carried out by Energoprojekt, a Yugoslav engineering and construction firm founded in 1951 to rebuild the country's war devastated infrastructure. By the early 1980s, Energoprojekt was the world's 16th largest engineering and construction company, employing 7,000 people. The company carried out large construction projects in Libya, Kuwait, Zambia and Guinea, and by the late 1960s, the company was competing in European markets in West Germany, Czechoslovakia, and the German Democratic Republic.  Many infrastructure projects in Africa and Asia were political deals, done for prestige reasons and included elements of foreign aid rather than being the result of economic calculation and competition.

The official workweek was 48 hours until 1963, when it was reduced to 42 hours. It was further reduced to 40 hours (plus one hour overtime allowed) in 1965 and to 36 (plus one) in 1970. 

In 1965, a new dinar was introduced. The previous dinar, traded at a rate of 700 to the U.S. dollar, was replaced with a new dinar traded at 12.5 to the U.S. dollar.

In 1967, legislation enabled foreign private investors to become partners with Yugoslav enterprises in joint ventures with up to 49% of capital, despite the fact that such arrangement would be classified as exploitation in Marxist theory.  German companies were especially interested in such arrangements and they represented about a quarter of foreign investments.  However, many foreign companies were disappointed by the poor efficiency and organization of Yugoslav enterprises; in one case, Japanese representatives concluded that they would consider investment only if half of the workers were fired.

The departure of Yugoslavs seeking work began in the 1950s, when individuals began crossing the border illegally. In the mid-1960s, Yugoslavia lifted emigration restrictions, and the number of emigrants, including educated and highly skilled individuals, increased rapidly, especially to West Germany. By the early 1970s, 20 percent of the country's labor force, or 1.1 million workers, were employed abroad. The emigration was mainly caused by forced deagrarianization, deruralization, and overpopulating of larger towns. The emigration contributed to keeping the unemployment in check and also acted as a source of capital and foreign currency. The system was institutionalized into the economy. From 1961 to 1971, the number of guest workers from Yugoslavia in West Germany increased from 16,000 to 410,000.

1970s

In the 1970s, the economy was reorganised according to Edvard Kardelj's theory of associated labour, in which the right to decision making and a share in profits of socially owned companies is based on the investment of labour. All industrial companies were transformed into organisations of associated labour. The smallest, basic organisations of associated labour, was roughly corresponded to a small company or a department in a large company. These were organised into enterprises, also known as labour organisations, which in turn associated with composite organisations of associated labour, which could be large companies or even whole industry branches in a certain area. Basic organisations of associated labour sometimes were composed of even smaller labour units, but they had no financial freedom. Also, composite organisations of associated labour were sometimes members of business communities, representing whole industry branches. Most executive decision making was based in enterprises, so that these continued to compete to an extent even when they were part of a same composite organisation. The appointment of managers and strategic policy of composite organisations were, depending on their size and importance, in practice often subject to political and personal influence-peddling.

In order to give all employees the same access to decision making, the basic organisations of associated labour were also introduced into public services, including health and education. The basic organisations were usually made up of dozens of people and had their own workers councils, whose assent was needed for strategic decisions and appointment of managers in enterprises or public institutions.

The workers were organized into trade unions which spanned across the country. Strikes could be called by any worker, or any group of workers and they were common in certain periods. Strikes for clear genuine grievances with no political motivation usually resulted in prompt replacement of the management and increase in pay or benefits. Strikes with real or implied political motivation were often dealt with in the same manner (individuals were prosecuted or persecuted separately), but occasionally also met stubborn refusal to deal or in some cases brutal force. Strikes occurred in all times of political upheaval or economic hardships, but they became increasingly common in the 1980s, when consecutive governments tried to salvage the slumping economy with a programme of austerity under the auspices of the International Monetary Fund.

From 1970 onwards, despite 29% of its population working in agriculture, Yugoslavia was a net importer of farm products.

During the 1960s and 1970s the country's social security expenditures increased 600%, as coverage of the population was extended and benefits were enlarged. The government introduced extensive subsidies for public health care, temporary disability and illness, old age pensions and assistance to mothers. There were, in particular, a great number of social security benefits intended to take the pressure of child raising off women, making it easier for them to focus on studying and gaining employment. Women received 90 days of paid maternity leave after having a baby, a range of other subsidies to help pay for food, clothing and other necessities. There were also subsidised public childcare services that low-income families could use for free.

Effect of the oil crisis
The oil crisis of the 1970s magnified the economic problems, the foreign debt grew at an annual rate of 20%, and by the early 1980s it reached more than US$20 billion. Governments of Milka Planinc and Branko Mikulić renegotiated the foreign debt at the price of introducing the policy of stabilisation which in practice consisted of severe austerity measures — the so-called shock treatment. During the 1980s, Yugoslav population endured the introduction of fuel limitations (40 litres per car per month), limitation of car usage to every other day, based on the last digit on the licence plate, severe limitations on import of goods and paying of a deposit upon leaving the country (mostly to go shopping), to be returned in a year (with rising inflation, this effectively amounted to a fee on travel). There were shortages of coffee, chocolate and washing powder. During several dry summers, the government, unable to borrow to import electricity, was forced to introduce power cuts. On May 12, 1982, the board of the International Monetary Fund approved enhanced surveillance of Yugoslavia, to include Paris Club creditors.

Collapse of the Yugoslav economy 

In the 1980s the Yugoslav economy entered a period of continuous crisis. Between 1979 and 1985 the Yugoslav dinar plunged from 15 to 1,370 to the U.S. dollar, half of the income from exports was used to service the debt, while real net personal income declined by 19.5%. Unemployment rose to 1.3 million job-seekers, and internal debt was estimated at $40 billion.

Yugoslavia took on a number of International Monetary Fund (IMF) loans and subsequently fell into heavy debt. By 1981, it had incurred $18.9 billion in foreign debt. In fact Yugoslavia's debt was just 20.11% of GDP in 1971, which is, when compared with UK (67.95%), USA (46.64%), Germany (17.87%), Italy (41.46%), a comparatively low rate. However, Yugoslavia's main concern was unemployment. In 1980 the unemployment rate was at 13.8%, not counting around 1 million workers employed abroad. Deteriorating living conditions during the 1980s caused the Yugoslavian unemployment rate to reach 17 percent, while another 20 percent were underemployed. 60% of the unemployed were under the age of 25.

By 1988 emigrant remittances to Yugoslavia totaled over $4.5 billion (USD), and by 1989 remittances were $6.2 billion (USD), which amounted to over 19% of the world's total. A large portion of those remittances came from Yugoslav professional and skilled workers employed by Yugoslav engineering and construction firms with contracts abroad, including large infrastructure projects in the Middle East, Africa and Europe. In the early 1980s, Yugoslav firm Energoprojekt was building dams, roads and apartment houses in Iraq, Libya and Kuwait. But during the recession of the early 1980s many oil exporting countries reduced construction projects as oil prices fell. Increased competition from countries like South Korea offering less expensive labor, also contributed to a decline in Yugoslavia's booming engineering and construction export trade.

In 1988 Yugoslavia owed US$21 billion to Western countries, which was to increase substantially annually had the country not defaulted.

The collapse of the Yugoslav economy was partially caused by its non-aligned stance that had resulted in access to loans from both superpower blocs on different terms. This contact with the United States and the West opened up Yugoslav markets sooner than in the rest of Central and Eastern Europe. In 1989, before the fall of the Berlin Wall, Yugoslav federal Prime Minister Ante Marković went to Washington to meet with President George H. W. Bush, to negotiate a new financial aid package. In return for assistance, Yugoslavia agreed to even more sweeping economic reforms, which included a new devalued currency, another wage freeze, sharp cuts in government spending, and the elimination of socially owned, worker-managed companies. The Belgrade nomenclature, with the assistance of western advisers, had laid the groundwork for Marković's mission by implementing beforehand many of the required reforms, including a major liberalization of foreign investment legislation.

The country's state owned banks obligated to adjust their interest rates to the inflation, but this could not be applied to loan contracts made earlier which stipulated fixed interest rates. During this time, foreign currencies became widely circulated and accepted by businesses along with cheques; especially the German mark.

The first hyperinflation stabilization program was adopted under the name Economic Reform Program, passed in late 1989, when, for the most part, due to total price liberalization, Yugoslavia was hit by hyperinflation. The monthly price level increased from month to month, and in December 1989, the inflation percentage was 45%. There was a constant rally in prices, wages and exchange rates. In such a situation in December 1989, the Economic Reform Program and measures for its implementation were adopted. 

The basic measures envisaged by this program were restrictive monetary policy and real positive interest rates, independence of the National Bank of Yugoslavia, denomination of the dinar by "deleting" four zeros, proclaiming the convertibility of the dinar and fixing the dinar exchange rate against the German mark at a ratio of 7:1, freezing of nominal wages for a period of 4 months, freezing of the prices of some inputs (energy products and infrastructure) for a period of 4 months, further foreign trade and fiscal account liberalization, rehabilitation of banks and companies through a special fund that would be formed with foreign financial support, negotiations with the Paris Club of Creditors about debt restructuring, and the International Monetary Fund and the World Bank for a loan to help stabilize the economy.

In the short term, or at the beginning of the application, the program showed some good results: there was a significant slowdown in price and salary growth, foreign exchange reserves -- whose level was significant even before the beginning of the application of the Program -- started to grow, there was marked positive progress in reducing the foreign trade and budget deficits, etc.  However, from the very beginning, there was a decline in industrial production and employment, and somewhat later, the initial positive results also started lacking (as a result of the rebound in prices and wages and the appearance of the "black" exchange rate, the foreign exchange reserves began to decrease rapidly, negative tendencies appeared in the foreign trade and budget sphere, etc.) and it soon became clear that Ante Marković's Program would fail.

The fate of this stabilization program was largely tied to stopping price growth. It was considered that only the prices of the main inputs were to be frozen, and in the conditions of restrictive monetary policy and liberalized imports there would be no growth in other freely formed prices, and even companies were expected to reduce prices in order to provide liquid assets. However, expectations did not materialize, and the prices recorded significant growth (the truth is noticeably smaller than before the program was adopted), which led to a rise in wages that (at the very beginning of the implementation of the Program) grew faster than price growth. In circumstances where this happens, one of the key elements of the Program persists – a fixed exchange rate.  All this led to a weakening of the competitiveness of the domestic economy, as exports become economically unfeasible, and imports were very lucrative. Bearing in mind that there had been a liberalization of imports, the domestic market was overwhelmed with imported products, which were absorbed by increasing domestic demand, almost exclusively for consumer goods fueled by rapid wage growth. Imports of goods became cheaper than domestic ones, so there was a decline in production because Yugoslav products were not competitive at all, not only in exports but also in the domestic market. After only a year and a half of implementation, industrial production was reduced by 25% and unemployment increased by 18%. This further led to strong recession movements in the economy, deterioration of the foreign trade balance and (after initial increase) a rapid reduction in foreign currency reserves, which prevents further "defending" of the foreign exchange rate. 

New legislation was gradually introduced to remedy the situation, but the government mostly tried to fight the crisis by issuing more currency, which only fuelled the inflation further. Power-mongering in big industrial companies led to several large bankruptcies (mostly of large factories), which only increased the public perception that the economy is in a deep crisis. After several failed attempts to fight the inflation with various schemes, and due to mass strikes caused by austerity wage freezes, the government of Branko Mikulić was replaced by a new government in March 1989, headed by Ante Marković, a pragmatic reformist. He spent a year introducing new business legislation, which quietly dropped most of the associated labour theory and introduced private ownership of businesses. The institutional changes culminated in eighteen new laws that declared an end to the self-management system and associated labor. They in turn allowed public companies to become privatised.

By the end of 1989 inflation reached 1,000%. On New Year's Eve 1989, Ante Marković introduced his program of economic reforms. Ten thousand Dinars became one "New Dinar", pegged to the German Mark at the rate of 7 New Dinars for one Mark. The sudden end of inflation brought some relief to the banking system. Ownership and exchange of foreign currency was deregulated which, combined with a realistic exchange rate, attracted foreign currency to the banks. However, by the late 1980s, it was becoming increasingly clear that the federal government was effectively losing the power to implement its programme.

Early 1990s
In 1990 Marković introduced a privatization program, with newly passed federal laws on privatization allowing company management boards to initiate privatization, mainly through internal share-holding schemes, initially not tradable in the stock exchange. This meant that the law put an emphasis on "insider" privatization to company workers and managers, to whom the shares could be offered at a discount. Yugoslav authorities used the term "property transformation" when referring to the process of transforming public ownership into private hands. By April 1990, the monthly inflation rate dropped to zero, exports and imports increased, while foreign currency reserves increased by US$3 billion. However, industrial production fell by 8.7% and high taxes made it difficult for many enterprises to pay even the frozen wages.

In July 1990, Marković formed his own Union of Reform Forces political party. By the 2nd half of 1990 inflation restarted. In September and October, the monthly inflation rate reached 8%. Inflation once more climbed to unmanageable levels reaching an annual level of 120%. Marković's reforms and austerity programs met resistance from the federal authorities of the individual republics. His program of 1989 to curb inflation was rejected by Serbia and Vojvodina. SR Serbia introduced customs duties on imports from Croatia and Slovenia and took $1.5 billion from the central bank to fund wage rises, pensions, bonuses to government employees and subsidize enterprises that faced losses. The federal government raised the exchange rate for the German Mark first to 9 and then to 13 dinars. In 1990 the annual rate of GDP growth had declined to -11.6%.

Although the Yugoslavian economy did include elements of workplace democracy and gave workers more democratic control over the economic management of enterprises, it also caused high regional inequality. Slovenia’s GDP Per Capita was 12383$ and Kosovo’s GDP Per Capita only 1592$ by 1989. The Gini index of SFRY ranged between 0.32 to 0.35, mainly due to the high regional inequality. Unemployment rates were also disproportionately high in poorer Yugoslavian republics. Such a sizeable regional disparity gave rise to separatism and eventually led to increased intra-state tensions in the Yugoslavian republics. However, the economic transition of Slovenia was rather successful, and it retained many institutional elements of the Former Yugoslavian economy, such as self-management and partial worker-controlled enterprises. The Slovenian Model can be seen as a reconciliation of Western European social democracy and the market socialism of the Yugoslavian economy. The large-scale privatization of state assets, banks, and shock therapy in other former Yugoslavian republics, such as Serbia, are, in contrast, unsuccessful. The economies of these states stagnate with a generally high level of corruption compared to the more successful Slovenian model.

Yugoslav economy in numbers – 1990 

(SOURCE: 1990 CIA WORLD FACTBOOK)

Inflation rate (consumer prices): 2,700% (1989 est.)

Unemployment rate: 15% (1989)

GDP: $129.5 billion, per capita $5,464; real growth rate – 1.0% (1989 est.)

Budget: revenues $6.4 billion; expenditures $6.4 billion, including capital expenditures of $NA (1990)

Exports: $13.1 billion (f.o.b., 1988); commodities—raw materials and semimanufactures 50%, consumer goods 31%, capital goods and equipment 19%; partners—EC 30%, CEMA 45%, less developed countries 14%, US 5%, other 6%

Imports: $13.8 billion (c.i.f., 1988); commodities—raw materials and semimanufactures 79%, capital goods and equipment 15%, consumer goods 6%; partners—EC 30%, CEMA 45%, less developed countries 14%, US 5%, other 6%

External debt: $17.0 billion, medium and long term (1989)

Electricity: 21,000,000 kW capacity; 87,100 million kWh produced, 3,650 kWh per capita (1989)

GDP per capita of republics ans autonomous provinces

GDP per capita of major cities

The post-war regime
For later developments, see: Economy of Bosnia and Herzegovina, Economy of Croatia, Economy of Kosovo, Economy of the Republic of Macedonia, Economy of Montenegro, Economy of Serbia, Economy of Slovenia.

The Yugoslav wars, consequent loss of market, as well as mismanagement and/or non-transparent privatization brought further economic trouble for all former republics of Yugoslavia in the 1990s. Only Slovenia's economy grew steadily after the initial shock and slump. Croatia's secession resulted in direct damages worth $43 billion (USD). Croatia reached its 1990 GDP in 2003, a few years after Slovenia, the most advanced of all Yugoslav economies by far.

See also
 Nationalization
 Relocation of Serbian industry during the Informbiro period

References

Further reading 
Leonard Kukić. 2018. Socialist growth revisited: insights from Yugoslavia, European Review of Economic History
SELF-MANAGEMENT AND REQUIREMENTS FOR SOCIAL PROPERTY: LESSONS FROM YUGOSLAVIA by DIANE FLAHERTY
Damachi, U.G. & H.D. Seibel (Eds.) Self Management in Yugoslavia and the Developing World. London, Macmillan, 1982
 Lampe, John. (1996) Yugoslavia as History: Twice there was a Country. Cambridge: Cambridge University Press.
 Patterson, Patrick Hyder. (2011) Bought and Sold: Living and Losing the Good Life in Socialist Yugoslavia. Ithaca, NY: Cornell University Press.
 Smith-Peter, Susan. (2019) "Communism and Regionalism." In Regionalism and Modern Europe: Identity Construction and Movements from 1890 to the Present Day. Ed. Xose M. Nunez Seixas and Eric Storm. London: Bloomsbury Academic, 135-149.

External links

Economies of Europe
Former communist economies
Economy
Market socialism